Matthew Stephens (born 1970) is a Bayesian statistician and professor in the departments of Human Genetics and Statistics at the University of Chicago. He is known for the Li and Stephens model as an efficient coalescent.

Education 
Stephens has a PhD from Magdalen College, Oxford University where his advisor was Brian D. Ripley. He then went on to work with Peter Donnelly as a postdoctoral researcher.

Career 
Stephens conducted postdoctoral research with Peter Donnelly at the University of Oxford. It was there that he developed STRUCTURE along with Jonathan Pritchard, a widely used computer program for determining population structure and estimating individual admixture. He then went on to develop the influential Li and Stephens model as an efficient model for linkage disequilibrium.

Awards 
Stephens was awarded the Guy Medal (Bronze) in 2006.

Notes

1970 births
British statisticians
Population geneticists
Statistical geneticists
Living people
20th-century British mathematicians
21st-century British mathematicians
Genetic epidemiologists